The  was a training unit of the Imperial Japanese Navy. This article handles Training Fleet and Training Detachment.

Organizations of the Training Detachment

Organizations of the Training Fleet

Bibliography
Monthly Ships of the World,  (Japan)
No. 441, Special issue Vol. 32, "Japanese cruisers", September 1991
No. 500, Special issue Vol. 44, "Ships of the Imperial Japanese Navy", August 1995
No. 754, Special issue Vol. 101, "History of Japanese cruisers", January 2012
The Maru Special,  (Japan)
Japanese Naval Vessels No. 44, "Cruiser Tone-class and Katori-class", October 1980
Japanese Naval Vessels No. 53, "Japanese support vessels", July 1981
Rekishi Dokuhon, Special issue No. 33 Overview of admirals of the Imperial Japanese Navy, Shin-Jinbutsuōraisha, October 1999
The Japanese Modern Historical Manuscripts Association, Organizations, structures and personnel affairs of the Imperial Japanese Army & Navy, University of Tokyo Press, January 1971 

Fleets of the Imperial Japanese Navy
Military units and formations established in 1906
Military units and formations disestablished in 1940
1906 establishments in Japan